Kai Leng is a village in Sheung Shui, North District, Hong Kong.

Administration
Kai Leng is a recognized village under the New Territories Small House Policy.

References

External links
 Delineation of area of existing village Kai Leng (Sheung Shui) for election of resident representative (2019 to 2022)

Villages in North District, Hong Kong
Sheung Shui